Krishnapur is a census town in the Kaliachak III CD block in the Malda Sadar subdivision of Malda district in the Indian state of West Bengal.

Geography

Location
Krishnapur is located by the coordinate of

Area overview
The area shown in the adjoining map is the physiographic sub-region known as the diara. It “is a relatively well drained flat land formed by the fluvial deposition of newer alluvium.” The most note-worthy feature is the Farakka Barrage across the Ganges. The area is a part of the Malda Sadar subdivision, which is an overwhelmingly rural region, but the area shown in the map has pockets of urbanization with 17 census towns, concentrated mostly in the Kaliachak I CD block. The bank of the Ganges between Bhutni and Panchanandapur (both the places are marked on the map), is the area worst hit  by left bank erosion, a major problem in the Malda area. The ruins of Gauda, capital of several empires, is located in this area.

Note: The map alongside presents some of the notable locations in the area. All places marked in the map are linked in the larger full screen map.

Demographics
According to the 2011 Census of India, Krishnapur had a total population of 16,470, of which 8,370 (51%) were males and 8,100 (49%) were females. Population in the age range 0–6 years was 2,931. The total number of literate persons in Krishnapur  was 6,732 (49.72% of the population over 6 years).

Infrastructure
According to the District Census Handbook, Maldah, 2011, Krishnapur covered an area of 9.9188 km2. It had 10 km roads with both open and closed drains. The protected water-supply involved overhead tank, tap water from treated sources, tube well/ bore well. It had 1,330 domestic electric connections. Among the medical facilities it had 12 medicine shops. Among the educational facilities, it had 8 primary schools, 1 middle school, 1 secondary school in town, the nearest general degree college at Malda 33 km away. It had the branch office of 1 cooperative bank.

References

Cities and towns in Malda district